Shalheh-ye Fazeli (also Romanized as Shalheh-ye Fāẕelī) is a village in Kut-e Abdollah Rural District, in the Central District of Karun County, Khuzestan Province, Iran. At the 2006 census, its population was 46, in 7 families.

References 

Populated places in Karun County